Creuzburg is a historic town and castle in Thuringia, Germany.

Creuzburg may also refer to:

Creuzburg (surname), a surname
Creuzburg (Verwaltungsgemeinschaft), an administrative division in Thuringia, Germany

See also
Kreutzberg (disambiguation)
Kreuzberg (disambiguation)
Kreuzburg (disambiguation)